Nelson is a village and the county seat of Nuckolls County, Nebraska, United States.  The population was 488 at the 2010 census. The city was named for C. Nelson Wheeler, the original owner of the town site.

History
The village was named as the county seat in 1873, and its position survived a challenge by Superior in 1889. Nelson's population reached a high of 1,000 in 1900, but has since declined gradually.

Geography
Nelson is located at  (40.202000, -98.066750).

Demographics

2010 census
As of the census of 2010, there were 488 people, 243 households, and 143 families residing in the city. The racial makeup of the city was 97.7% White, 0.2% from other races, and 2.0% from two or more races. Hispanic or Latino of any race were 1.6% of the population.

There were 243 households, of which 21.0% had children under the age of 18 living with them, 46.5% were married couples living together, 8.2% had a female householder with no husband present, 4.1% had a male householder with no wife present, and 41.2% were non-families. 37.4% of all households were made up of individuals, and 20.1% had someone living alone who was 65 years of age or older. The average household size was 2.01 and the average family size was 2.59.

The median age in the village was 50.3 years. 19.9% of residents were under the age of 18; 4.4% were between the ages of 18 and 24; 18.4% were from 25 to 44; 29% were from 45 to 64; and 28.3% were 65 years of age or older. The gender makeup of the village was 49.0% male and 51.0% female.

2000 census
As of the census of 2000, there were 587 people, 271 households, and 150 families residing in the village. The population density was 724.8 people per square mile (279.8/km2). There were 312 housing units at an average density of 385.2 per square mile (148.7/km2). The racial makeup of the city was 99.49% White and 0.51% from two or more races. Hispanic or Latino of any race were 1.19% of the population.

There were 271 households, out of which 22.9% had children under the age of 18 living with them, 46.1% were married couples living together, 7.0% had a female householder with no husband present, and 44.6% were non-families. 41.7% of all households were made up of individuals, and 25.5% had someone living alone who was 65 years of age or older. The average household size was 2.01 and the average family size was 2.73.

In the village, the population was spread out, with 20.3% under the age of 18, 3.9% from 18 to 24, 21.0% from 25 to 44, 23.7% from 45 to 64, and 31.2% who were 65 years of age or older. The median age was 50 years. For every 100 females, there were 80.6 males. For every 100 females age 18 and over, there were 75.9 males.

As of 2000 the median income for a household in the village was $32,500, and the median income for a family was $40,469. Males had a median income of $25,417 versus $22,500 for females. The per capita income for the village was $17,221. About 5.2% of families and 9.4% of the population were below the poverty line, including 14.8% of those under age 18 and 8.5% of those age 65 or over.

Notable person
Former Major League Baseball player Russ Snyder, who starred in the 1966 World Series, lives in Nelson.

See also
 National Register of Historic Places listings in Nuckolls County, Nebraska

References

External links
 City of Nelson
 A history of Nelson, with pictures

Cities in Nebraska
Cities in Nuckolls County, Nebraska
County seats in Nebraska